This list of governors of Kasaï-Occidental includes governors or equivalent officerholders of the Kasaï-Occidental province created in the Republic of the Congo in 1966 by combining the provinces of Luluabourg and Unité Kasaïenne, which became the districts of Lulua District and Kasaï District.
It also includes governors of the preceding provinces.
In 2015 the province was split into the Kasaï-Central and Kasaï provinces.

Luluabourg Province governors

The governors (or equivalent) of Luluabourg Province were:

Unité Kasaïenne governors

The governors (or equivalent) of Unité Kasaïenne were:

Kasaï-Occidental governors

The governors (or equivalent) of Kasaï-Occidental were:

See also

List of governors of Kasaï (former province)
Lists of provincial governors of the Democratic Republic of the Congo

References

Kasai-Occidental
Governors of provinces of the Democratic Republic of the Congo